Sidi Hajjaj Oued Hassar is a small town and rural commune in Médiouna Province of the Casablanca-Settat region of Morocco. At the time of the 2004 census, the commune had a total population of 20245 people living in 3723 households.

References

Populated places in Médiouna Province
Rural communes of Casablanca-Settat